Lee Brilleaux (born Lee John Collinson; 10 May 1952 – 7 April 1994) was an English rhythm-and-blues singer and musician with the band Dr. Feelgood.

Early life
Lee Brilleaux was born in Durban, South Africa, to English parents, was brought up in Ealing, and moved to Canvey Island with his family when he was 13.

Career
Brilleaux co-founded Dr. Feelgood with Wilko Johnson in 1971 and was the band's lead singer, harmonica player, and occasional guitarist. According to one obituary: "Brilleaux and Johnson developed a frantic act, often charismatically dressed in dark suits and loose ties, shabby rather than smart. The rough, and almost ruthless, edge which ran through his vocal and harmonica style reflected the character and philosophy of the band." In 1976, Brilleaux helped found Stiff Records, one of the driving forces of the "New Wave" of the mid- to late-1970s, with a loan of £500. Johnson left Dr. Feelgood in 1977 but Brilleaux continued the band with Gypie Mayo on guitar in 1978. Also in 1978, Brilleaux played harmonica on a track on David Coverdale's Northwinds album.  By 1984 he was the only founder member remaining. In 1986, he recorded the album Brilleaux, featuring songs by Johnny Cash. His last performance was in January 1994, at the Dr. Feelgood Music Bar in Canvey Island.

Death
Brilleaux died on 7 April 1994 of lymphoma, a month before his 42nd birthday, in his home in Canvey Island.

Legacy
After a one-year hiatus Dr. Feelgood appointed Pete Gage as their new vocalist.

In 2011, contemporary artist and Dr. Feelgood fan Scott King announced his intention to commemorate Lee Brilleaux by erecting a 300-foot gold-plated statue of the musician on the foreshore in Southend-on-Sea close to the legendary Kursaal where the band played some of their most important gigs. An e-petition was launched to collect signatures in support of the project, and it now has approximately 1500 signatures.

In 2014, music writer Zoë Howe announced her intention to write Roadrunner, a biography based on Brilleaux's life, including a collection of his life stories and memories, with classic and unseen images. The book reached 100% crowd-funding via Unbound on 18 May 2014. Howe is also the co-author of Looking Back at Me, an autobiography of Wilko Johnson, the original guitarist with Dr. Feelgood.
The book was published, by Polygon, as Lee Brilleaux: Rock'n'Roll Gentleman.

References

External links
 Tribute to Lee Brilleaux by Will Birch, first published in Uncut magazine, 2004
 Lee Brilleaux tribute at Dr Feelgood fan site
 Cult heroes: article from the Guardian, December 2015 

1952 births
1994 deaths
South African people of English descent
English rhythm and blues musicians
People educated at Ealing County Grammar School for Boys
People from Canvey Island
Protopunk musicians
English male singers
People from Ealing
20th-century English musicians
Dr. Feelgood (band) members
Deaths from cancer in England
Deaths from lymphoma